The Senior women's race at the 2023 World Athletics Cross Country Championships was held at the Bathurst in Australia, on February 18, 2023. Beatrice Chebet from Kenya won the gold medal by 8 seconds over Ethiopian Tsigie Gebreselama, while Agnes Jebet Ngetich finished third.

Race results

Senior women's race (10 km)

Individual

Team

References

World Athletics Cross Country Championships